Pareuchiloglanis is a genus of sisorid catfishes native to Asia. These species are rheophilic catfish chiefly found in the headwaters of major rivers in South and East Asia. They originate from the Brahmaputra drainage in India, east and south to the Yangtze drainage in China and the Annamese Cordillera drainages in southern Vietnam. Two species are known from the Mekong River: P. myzostoma and P. gracilicaudata. Four species are known from the (upper Mekong River) drainage of China: P. abbreviatus, P. gracilicaudata, P. myzostoma and P. prolixdorsalis.

Taxonomy
The monophyly of this genus remains doubtful. In 2007, a study rejected the monophyly of this genus.

The premaxillary tooth bands in the catfish tribe Glyptosternina are important in identifying genera; in Pareuchiloglanis, the tooth band is divided into two patches, appearing in two types. In one type, the premaxillary tooth patches appear separate, divided down the middle by a deeper indentation; this type is characteristic in P. feae. This group is distributed in and to the west of the Lancangjiang River and overlaps the distribution of Oreoglanis, Pseudexostoma and Exostoma. In the other type, the premaxillary tooth patches appear to be joined with a shallow indentation in the middle; this type is characteristic of all other species of Pareuchiloglanis. This group is distributed in and to the east of the Lancangjiang.

Species
There are currently 21 recognized species in this genus:
 Pareuchiloglanis abbreviata X. Li, W. Zhou, A. W. Thomson, Q. Zhang & Y. Yang, 2007 
 Pareuchiloglanis anteanalis S. M. Fang, T. Q. Xu & G. H. Cui, 1984
 Pareuchiloglanis brevicaudatus V. H. Nguyễn, 2005
 Pareuchiloglanis dorsoarcus (V. H. Nguyễn, 2005)
 Pareuchiloglanis feae (Vinciguerra, 1890)
 Pareuchiloglanis gracilicaudata (Y. F. Wu & Y. Chen, 1979)
 Pareuchiloglanis hupingshanensis Z. J. Kang, Y. X. Chen & D. K. He, 2016 
 Pareuchiloglanis longicauda (P. Q. Yue, 1981)
 Pareuchiloglanis macrotrema (Norman, 1925)
 Pareuchiloglanis myzostoma (Norman, 1923)
 Pareuchiloglanis namdeensis V. H. Nguyễn, 2005
 Pareuchiloglanis nebulifera H. H. Ng & Kottelat, 2000
 Pareuchiloglanis phongthoensis (V. H. Nguyễn, 2005)
 Pareuchiloglanis poilanei Pellegrin, 1936
 Pareuchiloglanis prolixdorsalis X. Li, W. Zhou, A. W. Thomson, Q. Zhang & Y. Yang, 2007 
 Pareuchiloglanis rhabdura H. H. Ng, 2004
 Pareuchiloglanis robusta R. H. Ding, T. Y. Fu & M. R. Ye, 1991 
 Pareuchiloglanis sichuanensis R. H. Ding, T. Y. Fu & M. R. Ye, 1991
 Pareuchiloglanis sinensis (Hora & Silas, 1952)
 Pareuchiloglanis songdaensis H. D. Nguyễn & V. H. Nguyễn, 2001
 Pareuchiloglanis tamduongensis V. H. Nguyễn, 2005
 Pareuchiloglanis tianquanensis R. H. Ding & S. G. Fang, 1997

Description
Pareuchiloglanis species have an interrupted groove behind their lips (post-labial groove), gill openings not extending onto the underside (venter), homodont dentition of pointed teeth in both jaws, tooth patches in the upper jaw joined into a band and not produced posteriorly at sides, and 13–16 branched pectoral rays. The head is depressed and the body is elongate and depressed anteriorly. The skin is smooth dorsally,
but it is often tuberculate ventrally. The eyes are minute, dorsal, and under the skin (subcutaneous). The lips are thick, fleshy, and papillated. The paired fins are plaited to form an adhesive apparatus.

References

Sisoridae
Catfish of Asia
Freshwater fish genera
Catfish genera
Taxa named by Jacques Pellegrin